The Denver Rush are a women's American football team in the Extreme Football League (X League) based in Loveland, Colorado, a suburb of Denver.

History
The Extreme Football League (X League) was announced in December 2019, as a successor to the Legends Football League (LFL). The announcement included the Rush, a successor to the LFL's Denver Dream. The X League's 2020 season was postponed, and the league also did not operate during 2021, amid the COVID-19 pandemic.

The Rush first competed during the 2022 X League season; they lost both of their regular season games, to the Seattle Thunder and Atlanta Empire, and did not advance to the postseason.

References

External links
 

Legends Football League US teams
American football teams in Denver
Women's sports in Colorado
2022 establishments in Colorado
American football teams established in 2022